Dennis Hunter Hardman (September 18, 1906 – July 8, 1997) was an American football coach.  He served as the head football coach at Alderson–Broaddus College—now known as Alderson Broaddus University—in Philippi, West Virginia for three seasons, from 1928 to 1930, compiling a record of 11–15–3. He attended Broaddus College from 1925 to 1929.

Around 1970, Hardman was serving as chairman of the Marshall State University Athletic Committee as well as working as a professor at the school.

References

1906 births
1997 deaths
Alderson Broaddus Battlers football coaches
People from Jackson County, West Virginia